Bally, sometimes spelled Bāli, is a census town in Bally Jagachha CD Block of Howrah Sadar subdivision in Howrah district in the Indian state of West Bengal. It is a part of Kolkata Urban Agglomeration.

Bally is under the jurisdiction of Nischinda Police Station of Howrah City Police.

Demographics
As per 2011 Census of India Bally had a total population of 113,377 of which 58,530 (52%) were males and 54,847 (48%) were females. Population below 6 years was 10,069. The total number of literates in Bally was 92,238 (89.28% of the population over 6 years).

As per 2001 census, Bally had a population of 92,906, out of which 49,414 were males and 43,492 were females. Bally has an average literacy rate of 79%, higher than the national average of 59.5%: male literacy is 84% and female literacy is 75%. In Bally, 9% of the population is under 6 years of age.

Transport
Bally has the junction of National Highway 16 (part of Asian Highway 45) and National Highway 19 at Bamandanga (Rajchandrapur). People can go to several places of Kolkata, Howrah and Hooghly from here. Bally is connected to Dakshineswar, Kolkata via Vivekananda Setu and Nivedita Setu.

Bus

Private Bus
 26 Champadanga - Bonhooghly
 26C Jagatballavpur - Bonhooghly
 40 Birshibpur - Serampore
 51 Pardankuni - Howrah Station
 79 Panchla - Dunlop
 81/1 Rajchandrapur - Barasat
 DN46 Dankuni Housing - Salt Lake Karunamoyee
 54 Ballykhal - Esplanade

CSTC Bus
 S23A Rajchandrapur - Salt Lake Karunamoyee
 AC23A Rajchandrapur - Salt Lake Karunamoyee
 AC50A Rajchandrapur - Garia

CTC Bus
 C23 Dankuni Housing - Park Circus
Many Shuttle Buses (Without Numbers) also pass through Bally.

Train
Bally has five railway stations of Kolkata Suburban Railway. They are Bally railway station (on Howrah-Bardhaman main line and Howrah-Bardhaman chord line), Belanagar railway station (on Howrah-Bardhaman chord line), Bally Ghat railway station, Bally Halt railway station and Rajchandrapur railway station (on Sealdah-Dankuni line).

Airport
Nearest Airport of Bally is Netaji Subhas Chandra Bose International Airport in Dumdum, Kolkata and it is easily accessible via Belghoria Expressway.

References

Cities and towns in Howrah district
Neighbourhoods in Kolkata
Kolkata Metropolitan Area